Down Low is a rap group formed in Kaiserslautern, Germany, in 1995 fronted by Americans Joe Thompson and Darren Tucker. Mike Dalien joined the group in 1996 since Joe and Darren had decided to go separate ways. The group is known for hits like "Johnny B."  Down Low are considered as one of the first groups to bring hip-hop music in a European style in the middle of the 1990s together with artists such as C-Block, Nana and A.K. S.W.I.F.T.

History 
The group was formed in December 1995 in the K-Town studios in Kaiserslautern. The members were American rapper Joe Thompson, who served in the U.S. Army during Operation Desert Storm and had a friendship with Rod. D from Fun Factory, as well as singer and fellow American Darren Tucker. The first single "Don't Look Any Further", a hip-hop version of the song of the same name of the M People received no attention; the second song "Vision of Life", however, became a hit in several European countries in the middle of 1996.

Shortly after the publication of "Vision of Life", Tucker had to leave the group due to disputes with his manager. He was replaced by Mike Dalien. The album Visions and the singles "Murder" over the case of O. J. Simpson, "Potion" and "Lovething/We Do It Like That" followed soon. Together with Flip Da Scrip, the group produced the song "Nothing Like Viva" as a hymn on the German music-television channel VIVA under the project name Hip Hop Alliance.

A second album, It Ain't Over, followed at the end of 1997. The song "Johnny B.", a cover version of The Hooters, became the group's largest hit and climbed to number four in the German single charts. Radio NRJ distinguished Down Low as the best rap act in 1997.

In the spring of 1998, the group created Rapper Against Racism in order to promote talented new singers and rappers (La Mazz, Trooper Da Don, Jay Supreme and others) and point a spot on racism still present in Germany at that time.
In the autumn of 1998 the group released the album Third Dimension. The single "Once Upon A Time" could tie to past successes; the probably saddest song of the group contained elements from the music by Ennio Morricone for the epic spaghetti-Western film Once Upon a Time in the West (1968).  With the song "H.I.V.", one drew the attention of the dangers of the AIDS virus.

After the publication of a greatest-hits album, the group took a break for  years. In 2001, the fourth album, The 4th Level, which was clearly an R&B-album, was released. Dalien left the group because of musical differences in 2001 at the beginning of the work on The 4th Level. His successor became Erick "Rick" Lamont Smith, who had already co-operated in the past with the group and had published some singles under the name La Mazz and Dressman. Since the German public had lost the interest in European rap in the meantime, the group could celebrate no further success in Germany. In 2002, the record company published a remix of Murder with samples of the rapper Warren G.

In 2003, the group released a DVD, Visions – The Singles 1997–2003. Shortly thereafter, Mike Dalien left the group and was replaced by Eric Lamont Smith. In the autumn of 2003, the single "Living in the Ghetto" appeared. The publication was, however, a single-handed attempt of the record company; the artists experienced only later of it, and for the lack of promotion the song found no commercial attention, but nevertheless became a club hit. Thompson accused SHIFT Music later of cannibalizing the group from money scarcities.

For 2004, an album, Down Low V / Adrenaline, was announced. But since the new style of the group did not please the record company, the album was not published. For a while it looked like as if the artists would possibly close a contract with a new label in the United States, for legal reasons probably under a new project name. However, in April 2005 Thompson announced that the group had settled the controversy with SHIFT and would work on new material again. The first song "Every Day (MMMM)" of the album Return of The Trendsetter was released 27 October 2006.

In June 2010, Dalien rejoined the group and Eric Smith left.

On 23 May 2014, Down Low released their comeback single "Friday Night".

Discography

Studio albums

Compilation albums

Singles

Other singles

Notes
The track is from the album The Message by Rappers Against Racism.

DVDs
2003
 Visions – The Singles 1997–2003

See also
 List of German musicians
 List of hip-hop musicians

External links
 Fan site with biography and discography at T-Music
 Fan site

Notes

1995 establishments in Germany
German hip hop groups
German rappers
Kaiserslautern
Musical groups established in 1995
ZYX Music artists